Mazar and  Mažár are surnames. Notable people with the surnames include:

Amihai Mazar (born 1942), Israeli archeologist
Benjamin Mazar (1906–1995), Israeli historian, archeologist, president of the Hebrew University of Jerusalem
Debi Mazar (born 1964), American actress
Eilat Mazar (1956–2021), Israeli archeologist
 Farida Mazar Spyropoulos (1871-1937), belly dancer
Tomáš Mažár (born 1980), Slovak handball player

See also